Celebrity Extra is a British celebrity entertainment series on  Living TV. It is presented by Tania Bryer, followed by Liz Bonnin after a major revamp.  Occasionally, Brian Dowling also hosted. It features a mixture of star interviews and reviews.

References

External links
 

2000 British television series debuts
2005 British television series endings
Sky Living original programming
English-language television shows